Lake Puma Yumco is a lake located at  above mean sea level on the southern Tibetan Plateau, and is situated within Nagarzê County of the Tibet Autonomous Region. Streams of water from the snow-capped surrounding mountains feed the lake, and its water surplus flows into Yamdrok Lake via an outlet located at its southeastern end. Some sediment can be seen entering the lake at its western end.

Puma Yumco literally means The Blue Jewel which is floating in the sky. The lake freezes in winter and is crossed by shepherds with their sheep. Since the climate is warming, the ice is becoming thinner and thus creates a problem for the 120 people living off and around the lake.

The lake is considered ultraoligotrophic, meaning that nutrient concentrations in both the water column and lake sediments are extremely low. Water in such lakes tends to be blue to blue-green and to have high clarity due to low levels of photosynthesizing organisms such as phytoplankton.

During the winter, the lake develops intricate ice block patterns on the surface, ranging from less than ten to hundreds of metres in diameter. The ice pattern is caused by repeated cycles of freezing, fracturing, and refreezing of the ice due to variations in temperature and wind-induced ice motion.

Climate
The area around Lake Puma Yumco has a dry tundra climate (ET) with long, very cold, very dry winters and short, cool, somewhat humid summers. There is a great variety between day and night. Summer temperatures often rise to 15 °C (59 °F), but even then they often fall below freezing at night time. Likewise, while temperatures do reach temperatures above freezing even in January, at night time they commonly reach −20 °C (−4 °F). Thanks to the cold temperatures, the lake is frozen over most of the year. There is almost no precipation in the winter months, most of the only 9.6 inches of precipation that fall during a year fall in July and August, and in that case as rain, snow is uncommon.

References 

 
 Arte TV Show Description

External links
 

Puma Yumco